Ričards Bolotņiks (born 24 March 1990) is a Latvian professional boxer who has held the WBO European light-heavyweight title since 2019.

Professional career
Bolotņiks played ice hockey when he was younger, but decided to try boxing since he had always wanted to fight. He made his professional debut on 15 August 2013, defeating Pavels Veselovs by first-round knockout (KO) in Riga. In his next seven bouts he won only three times, suffering losses in Germany, England and France. After that he managed a string of six victories from 2015 to 2016, during which he moved up a weight class to cruiserweight. Sitting on a 10–3–1 record, he faced Micki Nielsen in Riga on 27 January 2018, losing by controversial split decision (SD) to end his streak. Five months later he lost again to Thabiso Mchunu in South Africa, and decided to move back down to light-heavyweight.

On 12 October 2019, Bolotņiks defeated Sergei Ekimov (18–0, 9 KO) by unanimous decision (UD) in Riga for the vacant EBP light-heavyweight title, the first of his career. Later that month, he was announced as a participant in The Golden Contract light-heavyweight tournament that secures the winner a two-year, five-fight contract with MTK Global. In the quarter-finals, he matched up against undefeated Belfast native Steven Ward (12–0, 4 KO) at the Brentwood Centre in England on 14 December with his WBO European light-heavyweight title also on the line. Bolotņiks won the fight by first-round technical knockout (TKO) in an upset, flooring the champion three times en route to a new belt and a £5,000 knockout bonus. He retained his title in the semi-finals against Hosea Burton by ten-round UD in Riga on 26 September 2020.

Professional boxing record

References

External links
 

Living people
1990 births
Latvian male boxers
Light-heavyweight boxers
Cruiserweight boxers
Sportspeople from Riga